María Fernanda Figueroa Figueroa (born 22 June 1997), known as Fernanda Figueroa, is a Costa Rican footballer who plays as a forward for Dimas Escazú and the Costa Rica women's national team.

Club career
Figueroa has played for Dimas Escazú in Costa Rica.

International career
Figueroa made her senior debut for Costa Rica on 13 June 2021 as a 69th-minute substitution in a 0–0 friendly away draw against Guatemala.

References

External links

1997 births
Living people
People from Puntarenas Province
Costa Rican women's footballers
Women's association football forwards
Costa Rica women's international footballers